Cerro Corá is a municipality (município) in the Brazilian state of Rio Grande do Norte. As of 2020 IBGE, it reported an estimated population of 11,181 inhabitants. The municipality covers a total area of 394 km².

References

Municipalities in Rio Grande do Norte